Notagonum murrayense is a species of ground beetle in the subfamily Platyninae. It was described by Blackburn in 1890.

References

Notagonum
Beetles described in 1890